The enzyme 1,4-dihydroxy-2-naphthoyl-CoA hydrolase (EC 3.1.2.28; systematic name 1,4-dihydroxy-2-naphthoyl-CoA hydrolase) catalyses the following reaction:

 1,4-dihydroxy-2-naphthoyl-CoA + H2O  1,4-dihydroxy-2-naphthoate + CoA

This enzyme participates in the biosynthesis of menaquinones, and several plant pigments.

References

External links 
 

EC 3.1.2